Ecsenius trilineatus, known commonly as the three-lined blenny in Australia, and the white-spotted comb-tooth or the white-spotted combtooth blenny in Indonesia, is a species of combtooth blenny in the genus Ecsenius. It is a non-migoratory species of blenny found in coral reefs in the western central Pacific ocean. It can reach a maximum length of 3 centimetres. Blennies in this species feed primarily off of plants, including benthic algae and weeds, and are commercial aquarium fish, but of no interest in fisheries.

References
 Springer, V. G.   1972 (25 Oct.) [ref. 7647] Additions to revisions of the blenniid fish genera Ecsenius and Entomacrodus, with descriptions of three new species of Ecsenius. Smithsonian Contributions to Zoology No. 134: 1-13.

External links
 

trilineatus
Fish described in 1972
Taxa named by Victor G. Springer